Lewis Barker may refer to:

 Lewis Barker (politician) (1818–1890), United States lawyer and politician
 Lewis Barker (Australian Army officer) (1895–1981), Australian Army brigadier